Aphelia caradjana is a species of moth of the family Tortricidae. It is found in Russia, where it has been recorded from Khabarovsky Krai.

References

Moths described in 1916
Aphelia (moth)
Moths of Asia